Sodium dihydrogen arsenate is the inorganic compound with the formula NaH2AsO4.  Related salts are also called sodium arsenate, including  Na2HAsO4 (disodium hydrogen arsenate) and  NaH2AsO4 (sodium dihydrogen arsenate).  Sodium dihydrogen arsenate is a colorless solid that is highly toxic. 

The salt is the conjugate base of arsenic acid:
H3AsO4  H2AsO  +  H+  (K1 = 10−2.19)
In the laboratory, it is prepared in this way, crystallizing from a hot saturated aqueous solution, where it is highly soluble when hot (75.3 g in 100 mL at 100 °C).  It is obtained as the monohydrate. 

Upon heating, solid NaH2AsO4H2O, loses water of crystallization and converts to the pyroarsenate salt Na2H2As2O7.

References

Arsenates
Sodium compounds